is a Japanese sports sailor.

At the 2012 Summer Olympics, she competed in the Women's Laser Radial class, finishing in 31st place. At the 2016 Summer Olympics, she competed in the Women's Laser Radial class, finishing in 20th place. She competed at the 2020 Summer Olympics in Tokyo 2021, in Laser Radial and she finished in 15th place.

References

External links
 
 
 

1993 births
Living people
Japanese female sailors (sport)
Olympic sailors of Japan
Sailors at the 2012 Summer Olympics – Laser Radial
Sailors at the 2016 Summer Olympics – Laser Radial
Sailors at the 2020 Summer Olympics – Laser Radial
Asian Games medalists in sailing
Asian Games gold medalists for Japan
Asian Games silver medalists for Japan
Sailors at the 2014 Asian Games
Sailors at the 2018 Asian Games
Medalists at the 2014 Asian Games
Medalists at the 2018 Asian Games
21st-century Japanese women